Boolaloo Station, commonly referred to as Boolaloo, is a pastoral lease that once operated as a sheep station but now operates as a cattle station in Western Australia.

Adjoining properties include Mount Stuart to the east and Nanutarra Station to the south west. The Ashburton River flows through the property.

The station was established prior to 1892 by Mr. Young.
Arthur St Aubyn Barrett-Lennard and his brother, who also owned Red Hill Station, acquired Boolaloo in 1909 from Thomas Frederick de Pledge. The partnership later dissolved and Arthur became the sole owner of the property.

By 1911 the property was stocked with 12,000 sheep. The flock size reduced to 7,000 in 1914 then to rose to 9,000 in 1915 and 10 15,000 in 1916.

See also
List of ranches and stations

References

Stations (Australian agriculture)
Pastoral leases in Western Australia
Pilbara